Studeno is a settlement in the Municipality of Železniki in the Upper Carniola region of Slovenia. Building expansion has resulted in it becoming virtually part of the town of Železniki.

References

External links

Studeno at Geopedia

Populated places in the Municipality of Železniki